Hilliard Bradley High School is the newest high school in the Hilliard City School District in Hilliard, Ohio.  It is one of three high schools in the district along with Hilliard Davidson High School and Hilliard Darby High School. The school is located at 2800 Walker Road, just north of Brown Elementary School. The mascot is the Jaguar and the school's colors are royal blue, black and silver. Bradley High School is named in honor of Raymond K. Bradley, a former Hilliard Board of Education member and a lifelong Brown Township resident. It is the school that students from Hilliard Memorial Middle School will attend in High School.

The current principal is William Warfield. The school also retains three assistant principals and three guidance counselors.

Construction

Ground was broken on Hilliard Bradley High School on May 7, 2007 after Hilliard City School District residents passed a bond issue in May 2006 for the construction of a third high school and fourteenth elementary school. Bradley was dedicated on August 23, 2009, and opened for its first day of classes on August 25, 2009.

Environmental concerns

Bradley was constructed with all possible efforts in place to limit its effect on neighboring Big Darby Creek.  The system in place is designed to prevent erosion by limiting water running off from parking lots using drains that will allow water to seep directly into the ground. These measures contributed to 2% of the schools $65 million construction cost.

Notes and references

External links
Hilliard Bradley High School Official Website
Hilliard City School District Official Website

High schools in Franklin County, Ohio
Educational institutions established in 2009
Public high schools in Ohio
Hilliard, Ohio
2009 establishments in Ohio